The following is a list of notable Greek Americans, including both original immigrants of full or partial Greek descent who obtained American citizenship and their American descendants.

Architecture 
George J. Efstathiou – architect 
Costas Kondylis – architect
Nicholas Negroponte – architect and computer scientist

Business

Automobiles 
Elena Ford – Ford Motor Company heiress and officer

Agriculture 
Peter J. Taggares

Alcoholic beverages 
C. Dean Metropoulos – owner of Pabst Brewing Company

Chemicals and petroleum 
Andrew N. Liveris – CEO of Dow Chemical Company 
William S. Stavropoulos – past CEO and Chairman of The Dow Chemical Company
William Tavoulareas – president of Mobil Oil Corporation

Computer software & hardware 
Michael Capellas – terminal CEO of MCI and Compaq
Greg Papadopoulos – senior vice president and chief technical officer of Sun Microsystems Inc.
Stratton Sclavos – president & CEO of VeriSign
Ed Zander – CEO of Motorola and former president of Sun Microsystems

Consumer products 
John Paul DeJoria – cofounder of the Paul Mitchell line of hair products
Tom Kartsotis – founder of Fossil Group and Shinola Detroit 
Leo Stefanos – inventor of the Dove Bar

Education 
John Brademas – president of New York University
Peter Diamandopoulos – president of Adelphi University
Linda P.B. Katehi-Tseregounis – chancellor of the University of California, Davis
Constantine Papadakis – president of Drexel University
Paul Vallas – CEO of the Chicago Public Schools

Entertainment and media 
Kary Antholis – senior vice president for miniseries at HBO
 John P. Avlon, author, political commentator, CNN Senior Political Analyst and former Editor-in-Chief of The Daily Beast 
Nickolas Davatzes – retired president and CEO of A&E Television Networks
Jim Gianopoulos – chairman and CEO of Paramount Pictures 
George Kerasotes – one of the founders of Kerasotes Theatres, and United Theatre Owners of Illinois in 1947.
Oren Koules – entrepreneur, film producer, and professional sports executive
Alexander Pantages – vaudeville and early motion picture producer and impresario
Ted Sarandos – chief content officer for Netflix
Charles Skouras – movie magnate, president of Fox Coast West and National Pictures
George Skouras – movie magnate, president of United Artists
Spyros Skouras – movie magnate, president of 20th Century Fox
George Lois – advertising executive (ESPN, USA Today, Xerox, MTV, Wolfschmidt, Tommy Hilfiger), "Fizz Fizz What a Relief it Is", "No Dancing in the (a)Isles" "Crazy People" (Big break hired by Rossides for Javits 1960)

Finance and venture capital 
Peter Barris – American venture capitalist, FDA  
Christos Cotsakos – cofounder of E-Trade
Zoe Cruz – ex co-president of Morgan Stanley
Jamie Dimon – (Papademetriou) - CEO of JPMorgan Chase, grandson of Smyrna broker 
John Calamos – founder of Calamos Investments
Peter Peterson (Petropoulos) - ex-CEO of Bell & Howell, Lehman Bros, chair of Council on Foreign Relations, chair BlackStone, Nixon Commerce Scy
William Spell – founder and current president of Spell Capital Partners
Mike Vranos – hedge fund manager 
Harry Wilson – former investor and restructuring expert
 Jim Chanos - founder and president of Kynikos Associates

Game design 
Nikita Mikros – founder and CEO of Smashworx and Tiny Mantis Entertainment
Alex Rigopulos – video game designer, cofounder of Harmonix Music Systems

Inventor 
George Ballas – inventor of the weed eater, father of dancer Corky Ballas and grandfather to dancer Mark Ballas

Medical devices and pharmaceuticals 
Peter M. Nicholas – cofounder of Boston Scientific Corporation
P. Roy Vagelos – M.D. and former chairman and CEO of Merck
 Albert Burla - chairman and chief executive officer of Pfizer

Retail 
Sophia Amoruso – founder and owner of Nasty Gal
John Catsimatidis – founder of Gristedes Foods 
Tom Carvel – founder of the Carvel franchise
The Demoulas Brothers – founders of the DeMoulas' Market Basket

Real estate 
George Argyros – founder of real estate company Amel & Affiliates 
Sam Israel – investor and landlord
George Lycurgus – developer of hotels on Waikiki and the Volcano House
George P. Mitchell – original developer of the Woodlands
Alex Spanos – California realty magnate, chaired American Bible Society
George Tsakopoulos – real estate developer and founder of Tsakopoulos Investments in Sacramento, CA

Social media 
Jason Calacanis – angel investor (Uber), entrepreneur and founder of Weblogs, Inc.
Arianna Huffington – founder of Huffington Post
Alyssa LaRoche – founder of Aimee Weber Studio Inc.
Ted Leonsis – vice-chair of AOL 
Angelo Sotira – cofounder of the online community DeviantArt 
Gregg Spiridellis – cofounder of JibJab
Evan Spiridellis – cofounder of JibJab

Sports 
Peter Angelos – MLB owner of the Baltimore Orioles and former basketball player. Successful product-liability case lawyer.
Alex Anthopoulos – (May 25, 1977) Canadian-born baseball executive.  Currently GM and EVP of Atlanta Braves. Formerly GM and SVP of Toronto Blue Jays.
Alex Spanos – Deceased. Was owner of NFL's San Diego Chargers.
Dean Spanos – President and CEO of San Diego Chargers. Son of Alex Spanos.
A. G. Spanos – President of Business Operations of San Diego Chargers. Grandson of Alex Spanos.
Peter Karmanos Jr. – founder, president & CEO of Compuware and owner of the NHL team Carolina Hurricanes
Ted Phillips – president and CEO of the NFL team the Chicago Bears 
Ted Leonsis – founder, majority owner, chairman and CEO of Monumental Sports & Entertainment, which owns the NHL's Washington Capitals, NBA's Washington Wizards, NBA G League's Capital City Go-Go, WNBA's Washington Mystics, and the AFL's Washington Valor and Baltimore Brigade. Monumental Sports additionally owns the Capital One Arena in Washington, D.C. and manages the Kettler Capitals Iceplex and George Mason University's EagleBank Arena.
Tom Gores – Billionaire, businessman, investor.

Various 
Jim Davis (businessman) – chairman of New Balance
Peter Diamandis – magazine entrepreneur, founder of the International Space University
Prince Alexander von Fürstenberg – businessman and philanthropist
Lazaros Kalemis – founder and CEO of Alpha Card Services 
Michael Recanati – businessman and philanthropist
George Logothetis – founder and CEO of the Libra Group
Harry Markopoulos – forensic accounting and financial fraud investigator; Madoff investment scandal whistleblower
John Rigas – founder of Adelphia Communications Corporation
John Sitilides – government affairs and international relations specialist at Trilogy Advisors LLC in Washington, D.C.

Fashion

Cuisine
Cat Cora – Iron Chef on Food Network's Iron Chef America
Marisa Churchill – known for Top Chef (season 2), author of the Sweet & Skinny cookbooks, Food Network Challenge, and host of My Sweet & Skinny Life on Alpha channel in Greece.
George Mavrothalassitis – chef and restaurateur known as one of the cofounders of Hawaii Regional Cuisine in the early 1990s
Spike Mendelsohn – chef and restaurateur best known as the fifth-place finisher of the fourth season of Top Chef (2008–2009)
Michael Psilakis – restaurateur best known for his appearances on television shows including Ultimate Recipe Showdown, Iron Chef America, The Best Thing I Ever Ate and No Kitchen Required
Michele Ragussis – chef, best known as a finalist on the Food Network series Food Network Star (season 8)
Nicholas Stefanelli – chef and restaurateur, known for his Michelin-starred Italian restaurant Masseria
Michael Symon – Iron Chef on Food Network's Iron Chef America

Fashion
Patricia Field – fashion designer
James Galanos – fashion designer
Peter Speliopoulos – vice president, DKNY design
George Stavropoulos – fashion designer 
John Varvatos – fashion designer  
Nick Verreos – American fashion designer

Modeling

Betty Cantrell – beauty pageant titleholder, Miss Georgia 2015 & Miss America 2016
Margia Dean – former American beauty queen and actress, Miss California 1939
Patricia Kara – model, actress, TV personality
Katerina Katakalides – model and beauty pageant titleholder (Teen Miss New York 2016)
Cleo Maletis – beauty pageant titleholder
Becky and Jessie O'Donohue – American Idol contestants and models,
Ryan Pinkston – actor and model
Suzi Simpson – model, actress, aspiring screenwriter 
Jessica St. George – Playboy magazine Playmate of the Month (February 1965)
Stassie Karanikolaou – model
Eleanna Livaditis – Miss Colorado USA 2014
Maritsa Platis – Miss U.S. International 2020 
Eleana Frangedis – Miss Teen America 2012
Elena LaQuatra – Miss Pennsylvania USA 2016
Corinna Tsopei – Miss Universe 1964 - American actress
Sofia Richie Lionel's Richie daughter

Style
Vidal Sassoon – British and American hairstylist

Explorers and settlers
Pete Athans – mountaineer
Yiorgos Caralambo – one of the eight men hired by US Army in 1856 to lead the camel driver experiment in the Southwest.
John Cocoris – introduced the technique of sponge diving in 1905 to Tarpon Springs by recruiting divers and crew members from Greece. The first divers came from the Saronic Gulf islands of Aegina and Hydra, but they were soon outnumbered by those from the Dodecanese islands of Kalymnos, Symi and Halki. 
Philip Tedro, or Hadji Ali - hired by US Army in 1856 to lead the camel driver experiment in the Southwest.
Gracia Dura Bin – early settler, wife of Dr. Andrew Turnbull

Religious figures
Andrew Constantinides Zenos (1855–1942) Presbyterian minister, author, and dean of McCormick Theological Seminary  
Archbishop Iakovos – former Greek Orthodox Archbishop of America, Harvard professor, Selma marcher, president World Council of Churches
Aryeh Kaplan – American Orthodox rabbi of Greek-Sephardic descent from Thessaloniki
Eric Metaxas – author, essayist and biographer of Martin Luther, Dietrich Bonhoeffer and William Wilberforce
Betty Robbins – second Jewish female cantor in history
- Ambrosios Athanasios Mandilaris (Father Ambrose) (1872-1960) Greek Orthodox Church; President of Greek Coummunity of Chicago; called the Church Builder.

Law enforcement
Peter Angelos – product-liability case lawyer, owner of the MLB Baltimore Orioles and former basketball player. 
Stephanos Bibas – United States circuit judge for the United States Court of Appeals for the Third Circuit
James C. Cacheris – senior United States district judge for the United States District Court for the Eastern District of Virginia
Michael Chagares – federal judge on the United States Court of Appeals for the Third Circuit
Constantine George Cholakis – former United States federal judge
William P. Dimitrouleas – United States federal judge of the United States District Court for the Southern District of Florida
Peter C. Economus – United States federal judge on the United States District Court for the Northern District of Ohio
Maria Foscarinis – founder and executive director, National Law Center on Homelessness & Poverty
Nicholas Garaufis – senior United States district judge serving on the United States District Court for the Eastern District of New York
Constandinos Himonas – justice of the Utah Supreme Court
Kenneth M. Karas – United States district judge of the United States District Court for the Southern District of New York
Gregory G. Katsas – United States circuit judge for the United States Court of Appeals for the District of Columbia Circuit
Charles Petros Kocoras – United States federal judge of the District Court for the Northern District of Illinois
Thomas Demetrios Lambros – former United States federal judge
Paul J. Liacos – chief justice of the Massachusetts Supreme Judicial Court from 1989 to 1996
John Michael Manos – United States federal judge for 30 years
Costa M. Pleicones – jurist who served as the Chief Justice of the South Carolina Supreme Court
Eleni M. Roumel – Judge, United States Court of Federal Claims
John J. Stamos – justice of the Illinois Supreme Court from 1988 to 1990
Nicholas Tsoucalas – Senior Judge for the United States Court of International Trade
Paula Xinis – United States district judge of the United States District Court for the District of Maryland
John G. Papianou - American-born partner and chair of Montgomery McCracken's Litigation Department. Super Lawyer 2017-2019.

Literature

Drama: Theater, TV & Screenwriting
A. I. Bezzerides – novelist and screenwriter
Tina Fey – comedian, former head writer of Saturday Night Live and creator of 30 Rock
Zoe Kazan – screenwriter and playwright
Nico Mastorakis – novelist, script writer
Harry Mark Petrakis – novelist, short story writer, screenwriter, biographer, educator, and lecturer
Evan Spiliotopoulos – screenwriter

Fiction
A. I. Bezzerides – novelist and screenwriter
N. A. Diaman – novelist and artist
Jeffrey Eugenides – novelist and short story writer
Panio Gianopoulos – writer, editor
Nico Mastorakis – novelist, script writer
George Pelecanos – crime novelist and television drama writer (The Wire) 
Harry Mark Petrakis – novelist, short story writer, screenwriter, biographer, educator, and lecturer
Stephanos Papadopoulos – poet, translator
David Sedaris – essayist, author and radio contributor 
Eleni Sikelianos – experimental poet with a particular interest in scientific idiom
Byron Vazakas – poet (nominee for the Pulitzer Prize for Poetry, 1947)
Michael Katakis – writer, photographer, and manager of Ernest Hemingway's literary estate

Nonfiction 
Chloe Aridjis – writer (daughter of Greek-Mexican Homero Aridjis and American Betty Ferber de Aridjis)
Daphne Athas – writer
Nicholas A. Basbanes – author who writes and lectures widely about books and book culture
Demetrios Constantelos – priest and academic scholar
Rae Dalven – author and academic (Romaniote - Greek Jewish)
Nicholas Gage – reporter for The Wall Street Journal
Dan Georgakas – writer, critic and member of the editorial board for Cineaste
Panio Gianopoulos – writer and editor for Bloomsbury Publishing
Vanessa Grigoriadis – contributing editor for New York magazine and Rolling Stone magazine
George Gregoriou – William Paterson University professor, writer
Anna Halkidis – journalist, editor at Parents.com
Arianna Huffington (born Arianna Stassinopoulos) - columnist, pundit and founder of the liberal website The Huffington Post
John Kass – columnist, Chicago Tribune
Paul Kemprecos
Markos Kounalakis – president and publisher emeritus, 'Washington Monthly'; foreign affairs columnist, McClatchy
Leon Logothetis – British-born author who now lives in Los Angeles, TV host, global adventurer, traveler, and inspirational speaker.
Nick Mamatas
Eric Metaxas 
Markos Moulitsas – blogger and political columnist, founder of the liberal blog Daily Kos
Ion Hanford Perdicaris – author wrote about art and Moroccon culture.  Son of 1st U.S. consul to Greece Gregory Perdicaris and kidnap victim in 1904 internationally covered incident known as "The Perdicaris Incident" which was resolved by President Theodore Roosevelt with a US marine intervention.  A loose interpretation of the incident was the basis for the 1975 film The Wind and the Lion starring Sean Connery.
Andrew Sarris – film critic and a leading proponent of the auteur theory of criticism
Giorgio A. Tsoukalos

Media

Television 
Ernie Anastos – WNYW-New York City co-anchorman
Mike Emanuel - Fox News - Chief Washington Correspondent and anchor
Chloe Melas – American journalist
Thalia Assuras – TV reporter, CBS News (born in Canada, moved to U.S.)
Dean Brelis – foreign correspondent for NBC, CBS and Time magazine
Alexis Christoforous – CBS News Early Show
Chris Clark – lead news anchor at WTVF in Nashville, TN. He also gave Oprah Winfrey her first television job
Stefan Fatsis – National Public Radio 
Paul Glastris – editor-in-chief of The Washington Monthly
Nick Gregory – WNYW New York meteorologist for over twenty years
Chris Hondros – photojournalist
Elaina Athans – WTVD reporter 
Soterios Johnson – WNYC- morning anchor
Demetria Kalodimos – anchorperson for WSMV-TV Nashville, Tennessee 
Ernie Manouse – TV anchor/producer, PBS
Debbie Matenopoulos – journalist, talk show host
Maria Menounos – correspondent for Today and Access Hollywood
John Metaxas – WCBS New York radio correspondent
Ike Pappas – former CBS News correspondent
Nicole Petallides – Fox business reporter
Kopi Sotiropulos – meteorologist in Fresno, CA for KMPH-TV
Andrea Stassou – reporter for WCBS-TV in New York
George Stephanopoulos – host of ABC's This Week with George Stephanopoulos 
Martha Stewart - Cooking show host, television personality, lifestyle writer and expert, businesswoman
Andrea Tantaros – Former Fox News commentator and host.  Conservative political pundit.
Debbie Matenopoulos – television host, journalist, and lifestyle expert
Vicki Liviakis – journalist
Betty White - Actress and comedian

Radio 
Chris Douridas – DJ and actor in Los Angeles market.

Art and entertainment

Comedy 
Charlie Callas
Tina Fey
Zach Galifianakis
Demetri Martin
Amy Sedaris – father was of Greek descent 
Nia Vardalos
Betty White
Stavros Halkias – co-host of comedy podcast Cum Town

Dance

Choreography 
Hermes Pan – choreographer for Fred Astaire

Pop 
Corky Ballas – retired dancer, Dancing with the Stars father to Mark Ballas
Mark Ballas – professional dancer on Dancing with the Stars
Steve Condos – tap dancer
Natalie Fotopoulos - dance teacher, contestant on the Fox reality show So You Think You Can Dance

Tango 
Homer Ladas – Argentine tango dancer and teacher
Karina Smirnoff – dancer Dancing with the Stars, Forever Tango. Her mother is Russian; her father is Greek,

Film and theater

Actors 
Jack Angel – actor, who has worked on many radio programs, animated television series, movies and video games
John Aniston – actor, born Yannis Anastasakis, father of actress Jennifer Aniston
Lou Antonio – actor, best known for performing in the films Cool Hand Luke and America America
David Batista (Bautista) - former WWE professional wrestler (Greek mother and Filipino father) and actor
Ted Beniades – character actor of screen and stage who was best known for appearing in Brian De Palma's Scarface as Siedelbaum
Abraham Hercules Benrubi – actor
Dennis Boutsikaris
Jimmy Workman – actor
Charlie Callas – comedian and actor
John Cassavetes – movie director, actor
Paul Cavonis – TV and movie actor
George Chakiris – Academy Award winner "Best Supporting Actor" for West Side Story (1961 film)  
Michael Chiklis – of 3/4 Greek descent
John Considine – grandson of vaudeville and film producer Alexander Pantages on his mother's side, and nephew on his father's side to writer Bob Considine. Brother to actor/writer Tim Considine. Notable for his role as a writer for the 1960s American television series Combat! as well as appearances as an actor in series like Knight Rider and Murder, She Wrote.
Tim Considine – actor, writer and photographer, grandson of vaudeville and film producer Alexander Pantages. Noted for his writing work on the American TV series Combat!, along with his brother John Considine, and his starring role as Jamie Frederick in My Three Sons.
Michael Constantine – actor, born Constantine Ioannides, son of Greek immigrants.
Nick Dennis – actor, known for playing ethnic types in films such as Kiss Me Deadly, Sirocco and A Streetcar Named Desire
Chris Diamantopoulos (born 1975) - Canadian-born actor
Michael Flessas – actor, Palme d'Or (Golden Palm) winning film Dancer in the Dark at the Cannes Film Festival. Paternal grandparents both born in Greece.
Zach Galifianakis – father is of Greek descent 
Tony Ganios – actor, probably best known for his role as Anthony 'Meat' Tuperello in the 1982 hit comedy Porky's and its sequels
Christopher George  – "The Rat Patrol" (1966–68)
Tom Hanks – actor, filmmaker, and comedian
Ant (Anthony Steven Kalloniatis) - Last Comic Standing comedian
John Kapelos – Canadian-born actor of film and TV
Robert Karvelas – actor who is notable for his role as the Chief's dense assistant, Larrabee, on the 1960s sitcom Get Smart
Andreas Katsulas
Nick Kiriazis – actor 
Nikos Kourkoulos – Greek stage and film star who also appeared on Broadway.
Elias Koteas – Canadian/US movie actor
Peter Lupus – bodybuilder and actor, best remembered for the role of Willy Armitage in the original Mission: Impossible television series in the 1960s
Ralph Macchio – father is of half-Italian and half-Greek descent 
George Maharis
Rami Malek – American movie actor of partial Greek descent. 
Jason Mantzoukas – American actor, comedian, and writer.

Adoni Maropis – star of 24 among other titles. 
Constantine Maroulis
David Mazouz – actor, his mother is of Greek-Jewish descent
Andy Milonakis
Nico Minardos
Ryan Pinkston – TV and movie actor; model, mother is of Greek descent

Chris Sarandon
George Savalas
Telly Savalas 
Stelio Savante – actor, producer and writer whose credits include Ugly Betty, Running For Grace, My Super Ex Girlfriend and No Postage Necessary
Zachary Scott – actor who was most notable for his roles as villains and "mystery men"
Alexander Scourby – actor and narrator, played 'Old Polo' in Giant, James Dean's last film
Alek Skarlatos – US Army National Guard soldier awarded the Soldier's Medal from US President Barack Obama and the Legion of Honor by French President François Hollande for his participation in the thwarting of terrorist train attack on the 2015 Thalys train attack. Portrayed himself in Clint Eastwood's film The 15:17 to Paris (2018). 
Ted Sorel – actor whose numerous credits included Guiding Light, Law & Order and Star Trek: Deep Space Nine
John Stamos – father was of Greek descent 
Gus Trikonis – actor appeared in West Side Story along with his sister, Gina Trikonis. 1st husband of Goldie Hawn.
Dan Vadis – actor famous for his lead roles in many Italian films made in the 1960s
Titos Vandis – Greek stage and film star. Later starred on Broadway and in Hollywood. Character actor in over 100 U.S. TV shows and dozens of U.S. films.

Demetrius Joyette – actor
Billy Zane – actor and director, best known for his role as Caledon Hockley in the film Titanic.

Actresses 
Jennifer Aniston – father is Greek, Golden Globe and Primetime Emmy Award-winning film/television actress, best known for her role as Rachel Green on the sitcom Friends, daughter of actors John Aniston and Nancy Dow. 
Paula Cale
Dimitra Arliss – actress
Gabrielle Carteris – actress, best known for her role as Andrea Zuckerman on the television series Beverly Hills, 90210 (father was of Greek descent)
Jessica Chastain – Academy Award-winning actress (distant origin on her father's side)
Katie Chonacas
Margia Dean – former American beauty queen and actress
Nancy Dow – actress, mother of actress Jennifer Aniston, is said to have some Greek ancestry
Olympia Dukakis – Academy Award and Golden Globe-winning actress.  
Tina Fey – mother is of Greek descent 
Heather Goldenhersh – Tony Award nominated actress
Xenia Gratsos
Sasha Grey – content creator-presenter/former adult star; mixed Greek, Irish and Polish ancestry
Angie Harmon – maternal grandparents were of Greek descent
Lindsay Hartley – mother is of part Greek descent
Marilu Henner
Melina Kanakaredes – actress, best known for Providence and CSI: NY
Kym Karath – actress, best known for her role as Gretl in The Sound of Music
Zoe Kazan – actress, paternal grandfather, Elia Kazan, was Greek
Melia Kreiling – actress, Greek mother
Lauren Lapkus-actress, screenwriter Greek-Serbian mother.
Maria Menounos
Sofia Milos
Alexa Nikolas

Elizabeth Perkins – father was of Greek descent
Jamie-Lynn Sigler – father is of Greek Jewish and Romanian Jewish descent
Marina Sirtis - played Counselor Deanna Troi in Star Trek: The Next Generation.
Tracy Spiridakos – actress, born in Canada by Greek-born parents, best known for her role as Charlotte "Charlie" Matheson in the NBC post-apocalyptic science fiction series Revolution.
Mena Suvari – actress, best known for her roles in the films American Pie and American Beauty, maternal grandmother was of Greek descent
Gina Trikonis – actress who appeared in West Side Story along with her brother Gus Trikonis.
Nia Vardalos – actress. From My Big Fat Greek Wedding; Canadian-born
Gloria Votsis – actress. She is known for her small roles in several TV series such as Hawaii Five-0, The Gates, CSI, CSI: NY, CSI: Miami, and Suburgatory. Votsis also had a starring role in the film The Education of Charlie Banks alongside Jesse Eisenberg. She also recurred as Alex Hunter on the USA drama White Collar.
Betty White – maternal grandfather was Greek - actress
Rita Wilson – actress, film producer and singer, mother is of Greek descent 
Tiffani Thiessen – actress
Ariel Winter – actress
Shanelle Workman – voice actress for various video games and animated TV shows, mother is of Greek descent
Elena Kampouris – actress
Haley Pullos – actress
Lisa Zane – actress and singer, sister of actor Billy Zane.

Art direction, costume design, set design 
George Barris (auto customizer) – designer and builder of many famous Hollywood custom cars, including The Batmobile for the Batman (TV series).
Anna Louizos – Tony award nominated scenic designer and art director
Dean Tavoularis – Academy Award winner for Best Art Direction (The Godfather Part II)
Mary Zophres – costume designer, nominated for the Academy Award for Best Costume Design for the 2010 film True Grit

Choreography 
Hermes Pan – choreographer for Fred Astaire

Cinematography 
Chris Condon – cinematographer and 3D pioneer
Michael Gioulakis – cinematographer
Phedon Papamichael – director, cinematographer
Harris Savides – cinematographer

Directors 
Alexandra Cassavetes – director, daughter of John Cassavetes
John Cassavetes – movie director, actor
Nick Cassavetes – movie director
Tom Cherones – director and producer of several TV series. His most well-known directing work is on Seinfeld
George Pan Cosmatos1, film director, Tombstone, Rambo: First Blood Part II
Milton Katselas – director, Hollywood acting teacher
Elia Kazan – movie director, two-time Academy Award winner for Gentleman's Agreement and On the Waterfront, A Streetcar Named Desire, Viva Zapata, East of Eden 
Tony Leondis – film director, writer and voice actor of animation
Dimitri Logothetis
Gregory Markopoulos – film director, New American Cinema of the 1960s
Paolo Marinou-Blanco – film director and screenwriter
Nico Mastorakis – film and TV director
Melina Matsoukas
Andrew Moskos – producer/owner of Boom Chicago
Alexander Payne – Academy Award winning movie director
Nikos Psacharopoulos – theater producer, director, and educator
Andy Sidaris – film director of cult B-movie films
Penelope Spheeris – director (Wayne's World)
Greg Yaitanes – television and film director
Billy Zane – actor, director

Makeup and special effects 
Karen Goulekas – visual effects artist
Jack Pierce – designer of makeup and costumes for all of Universal Studios's iconic movie monsters, including: Frankenstein, Dracula, The Wolf Man, et al.
Patrick Tatopoulos – special effects and creature designer
Petro Vlahos – Oscar-awarded Hollywood special effects pioneer

Producers 
Jean Doumanian – born Jeannine Karabas.  Early associate producer of Saturday Night Live and briefly replaced Lorne Michaels as Executive Producer;  Producer of seven Woody Allen films.  Tony-award winning producer of several Broadway plays.
Sid Ganis
Laeta Kalogridis – screenwriter, TV and film producer
Tom Kapinos
Anthony Katagas – film producer
Nicholas Kazan – screenwriter, film producer, director. He is the son of director Elia Kazan and his first wife, playwright Molly Kazan
Nico Mastorakis – film and TV producer
Dino Stamatopoulos – television comedy writer, actor and producer who has worked on Mr. Show, TV Funhouse, Mad TV, Moral Orel, and Late Night with Conan O'Brien 
Ted Sarandos – chief content officer at Netflix 
David Brookwell - TV and film producer. Mother of Greek descent

Props 
George Barris (auto customizer) – designer and builder of many famous Hollywood custom cars

Sound 
Mildred Iatrou Morgan – sound editor and audio engineer, nomination for the Academy Award for Best Sound Editing at the 89th Academy Awards

Magicians 
Criss Angel – illusionist

Musicians

Composer 
Marco Beltrami – film composer
John Cacavas – composer, conductor
Dinos Constantinides - composer
Andreas Makris - composer, conductor
Basil Poledouris – film composer
Christopher Theofanidis - composer
George Tsontakis - composer
James Yannatos - composer, conductor

Conductor 
Maurice Abravanel – conductor of classical music
John Cacavas – composer, conductor
Alexander Frey – conductor, pianist, organist, composer, recording artist
Donald Johanos – conductor and music director with the Dallas Symphony Orchestra and the Honolulu Symphony Orchestra
Steven Karidoyanes – composer, broadcaster and conductor with Plymouth Philharmonic Orchestra
Dimitris Mitropoulos – world-renowned symphony conductor

Producers 
George Drakoulias – music producer
Dino Fekaris – Grammy awarded composer (I will survive)
Nick Venet – record producer

Classical 
Lefteris Bournias – clarinetist
William Masselos – classical pianist
Murray Perahia – concert pianist and conductor with roots in Thessaloniki

Country & western 
Kostas Lazarides – songwriter for many top C&W artists including: Dwight Yoakam, Patty Loveless, George Strait, and Travis Tritt.
Lane Brody – singer. Born "Eleni Voorlas" in Chicago area. Brody and Johnny Lee wrote lyrics to and recorded the theme music for the 1983–1984 NBC television show, The Yellow Rose. The theme song of the same name became a No. 1 hit on the U.S. country singles chart on April 21, 1984.

Dark cabaret 
Lola Blanc – singer, songwriter; her father is Greek-American.

Disco 
Lourett Russell Grant – singer and record producer

New age 
Chris Spheeris – new age multi-instrumentalist, composer, recording artist, collaborated on several albums with Paul Voudouris
Paul Avgerinos – composer, performer and producer of new-age music
Yanni – new-age musician

Opera 
Maria Callas – considered one of the greatest opera sopranos of all time
Tatiana Troyanos – mezzo-soprano

Pop 
The Andrews Sisters – singers
Helena Paparizou – pop artist. Represented Greece in Eurovision 2001 and Eurovision 2005 and won in 2005. Father is Greek. Mother is of Swedish and Hawaiian descent. 
Kelly Clarkson – American Idol (Season 1) winner 
Kalomoira – pop singer 
George Michael Pop singer and songwriter 
Nick Noble (singer) – pop singer, popular in the mid-1950s and best known for his recordings of The Tip of My Finger and Moonlight Swim
Tony Orlando – singer. Half Greek and half Puerto Rican.
Chris Trousdale (born 1985) - singer, former Dream Street member
Jim Verraros (born 1983) - singer, entertainer, one of the top 10 finalists in the first season of American Idol

Rock and metal
Art Alexakis – singer/songwriter/guitarist, member of Everclear
Teddy Andreadis – keyboardist
Johnny Antonopoulos – singer/guitarist
Seven Antonopoulos – rock drummer
Tommy Clufetos – session drummer
Warren Cuccurullo – rock musician and long-term member of Duran Duran
Greg Dulli – musician
The Fiery Furnaces – indie rock band
Tomas Kalnoky – lead singer/guitarist and songwriter of the bands Streetlight Manifesto and Bandits of the Acoustic Revolution
Anthony Kiedis - Lead singer of the band Red Hot Chili Peppers, songwriter 
Wayne Kramer – guitarist for Motor City Five
Tim Lambesis – lead singer of Metalcore band As I Lay Dying
Tommy Lee – heavy metal drummer 
Jim Matheos – guitarist and the primary songwriter for the progressive metal band Fates Warning
Vicky Psarakis – vocalist of Canadian metal band The Agonist.
Jim Sclavunos – drummer for Nick Cave and the Bad Seeds
Derek Sherinian – virtuoso rock and jazz fusion keyboardist
Jim Tasikas – primary songwriter and guitarist for progressive death metal band Contrarian (band)
Alex Varkatzas – lead singer of Hard Rock/Metalcore band Atreyu
Frank Zappa – composer

Rap 
Peter Anastasopoulos (MadClip) - singer
Arizona Zervas – rapper, singer and songwriter
Andy Milonakis - streamer, actor, comedian and rapper

Rock and roll 
Sarah Aroeste – Manhattan-based Jewish Ladino musician with roots in the Jewish Community of Thessaloniki.
Annette Artani – singer-songwriter
Amalia Bakas – singer of Greek traditional and rembetiko songs with a successful career in the United States.
 Sylvia Constantinidis – Venezuelan-born pianist, conductor, writer, music educator and composer.
Nickitas J. Demos – composer of contemporary classical music drawing from Greek inspiration.
Tatiana von Fürstenberg – rock singer
Diamanda Galás – performance artist, vocalist, and composer
Nick Gravenites – blues, rock and folk singer-songwriter
Fran Jeffries – singer, dancer, actress, and model
 James J. Kellaris - award-winning composer of contemporary classical music drawing from Greek and Byzantine themes.
Paul Lekakis – singer
Jessie Malakouti – singer
Athan Maroulis – singer, producer, musician, older brother of American Idol Season 4 finalist Constantine Maroulis
Constantine Maroulis – singer, stage actor, American Idol (Season 4) finalist
Dimitri Minakakis – original singer and founding member of the band The Dillinger Escape Plan
Ted Nichols – composer conductor, arranger, educator, minister of music
Becky O'Donohue – singer and American Idol (Season 5) semi-finalist
Johnny Otis – rhythm and blues musician
Shuggie Otis – rock, blues & funk guitarist and songwriter
Jimmie Spheeris – singer-songwriter in the 1970s
The Vanity Set – alternative/rebetiko rock band

Visual arts

Comics, cartoons 
Chris Eliopoulos – cartoonist and letterer of comic books
Christos Gage – DC/Marvel Comics/Wildstorm and Law & Order writer
Nicholas Galifianakis – cartoonist and artist who draws satirical cartoons
Bill Jemas – former publisher of Marvel Comics & former executive vice president of Marvel Entertainment Group
Stephan Pastis – cartoonist and the creator of the comic strip Pearls Before Swine
George Roussos – comic book artist best known as one of Jack Kirby's Silver Age inkers
Bob Rozakis – comic book writer and editor known mainly for his work in the 1970s and 1980s at DC Comics
Mark Alan Stamaty – cartoonist and children's book writer and illustrator
Aliki Theofilopoulos – cartoonist and director

Graffiti 
Alex Martinez – graffiti artist, illustrator, muralist (Greek mother)
Taki 183 – original artist who spawned the Graffiti craze in New York City of 1960s-70s. Demetrios/Demetraki ("Taki") hailed from 183rd Street in Washington Heights, hence his moniker "Taki 183".

Illustrators 
Constantinos Coconis – illustrator
Cleo Damianakes – etcher and illustrator of 1920s book dust jackets for Hemingway and Fitzgeralds
Basil Gogos – horror painter/illustrator
George Stavrinos – illustrator (Society of Illustrators Hall of Fame)

Painters 
William Baziotes – painter, a contributor to Abstract Expressionism
Theodoros Stamos – painter, a contributor to Abstract Expressionism, member of The Irascibles
Constantino Brumidi – Congressional Medal of Honor for paintings inside U.S. Capitol building. 
Thomas Chimes – painter
Lillian Delevoryas – artist whose career spanned six decades
Dino Kotopoulis – artist
Ethel Magafan – painter and muralist
William Spencer Bagdatopoulos – painter and commercial artist
Anthony Velonis – painter and designer, who helped introduce the public to silkscreen printing in the early 20th century
Jean Xceron – abstract painter

Performance artists 
Mary Ashley – video artist, performance artist, and painter

Photography 
Marie Cosindas – photographer, best known for her evocative still life and color portraits
Chris Hondros – Pulitzer Prize-nominated war photographer
James Karales – Pulitzer Prize awarded photographer
Christopher Makos – photographer for Calvin Klein, Esquire and Andy Warhol 
Constantine Manos – photographer (Leica Medal of Excellence in 2003)
Tod Papageorge – art photographer 
Ithaka Darin Pappas – photographic artist and celebrity portraitist i.e.: NWA Straight Outta Compton, Marlee Matlin, Giancarlo Esposito, Takashi Murakami etc.
Andrew Prokos – architectural and fine art photographer
Popsie Randolph – photographer
George Tames – photographer for The New York Times from 1945–1985
Paul Vathis – photojournalist for the Associated Press for 56 years (Pulitzer Prize for Photography in 1962)

Sculptors 
Stephen Antonakos – sculptor 
Peter Forakis – abstract geometric sculptor
Zenos Frudakis – figurative sculptor
Chryssa – sculptor
Lynda Benglis – sculptor and visual artist 
Dimitri Hadzi – sculptor
Nicholas Legeros – bronze sculptor
Peter Voulkos – sculptor, ceramics art innovator
Electros Vekris – Sculptor kinetics

Unfiled 
Michael Janis – glass artist, one of the directors of the Washington Glass School, known for his work on glass using the exceptionally difficult sgraffito technique on glass
Kimon Nicolaides – art teacher, author and artist, who developed the widely used method of teaching drawing "The Natural Way to Draw"
Ithaka Darin Pappas – multi-disciplinary artist, creator of The Reincarnation of a Surfboard, credited with being the founder of the Contemporary Surf Art movement

Military
Gus George Bebas – naval aviator and a recipient of the Distinguished Flying Cross
LTG Peter G. Burbules – retired United States Army Lieutenant General. U.S. Army Ordnance Hall of Fame.
Matthew Bogdanos – colonel in the United States Marine Corps Reserves
Chris Carr – United States Army soldier and a recipient of the United States military's highest decoration—the Medal of Honor
Alden Partridge Colvocoresses – developer of the first satellite map of the United States
George Colvocoresses – commander of the Saratoga during the American Civil War 
George Partridge Colvocoresses – led a distinguished military career rising to the rank of Admiral
George Dilboy – first Greek-American to receive Medal of Honor 
Andrea Dimitry – Greek-American soldier in the War of 1812 fought in the Battle of New Orleans
George Doundoulakis – Greek-American soldier who worked under British Intelligence during World War II and served with the OSS in Thessaly, Greece. Later becoming a physicist, he is known by his twenty-six US patents in the fields of radar, electronics, and narrowband television.
Helias Doundoulakis – served in the United States Army and the Office of Strategic Services — the OSS — as a spy during the Battle of Crete in WWII. Later becoming a civil engineer, he worked on many elite projects for the U.S. Navy and NASA as project leader at Grumman Aerospace.  Brother of George Doundoulakis.
Michel Dragon (1739–1821) Greek American Lieutenant in the American Revolution fought in the Siege of Pensacola.
Photius Fisk (1809–1890) American abolitionist, Chaplain U.S.N., lobbied to abolish flogging in the U.S. Navy
Jack H. Jacobs, Vietnam War veteran. Medal of Honor recipient (of Romaniote Jewish descent).
James G. Kalergis – U.S. Army officer who played a significant role in the post-Vietnam era reorganization of the U.S. Army
George Marshall (1781–1855) served in the U.S. Navy during the War of 1812, he was a Master Gunner and wrote Marshall's Practical Marine Gunnery.
James Megellas – retired United States Army officer, the most decorated officer in the history of the 82nd Airborne Division, received a Distinguished Service Cross, a Silver Star, and been nominated for the Medal of Honor
Charles Moskos – leading military sociologist in the US Military. Author of Greek Americans: Struggle and Success.
William Pagonis – retired three-star U.S. Army General and chairman of the board for RailAmerica
Steve Pisanos – (November 10, 1919 – June 6, 2016) aka "The Flying Greek" - flying ace who served as a fighter pilot with the British Royal Air Force (RAF) and later in the United States Army Air Forces in World War II.  He retired in 1974 from the U.S. Air Force as a colonel. 
Andrew P. Poppas – United States Army lieutenant general currently serving as the director of the Joint Staff
George Sirian – served in the US Navy with distinction for nearly fifty years
Alek Skarlatos – US Army National Guard soldier awarded the Soldier's Medal from US President Barack Obama and the Legion of Honor by French President François Hollande for his participation in the thwarting of terrorist train attack on the 2015 Thalys train attack. Portrayed himself in Clint Eastwood's film The 15:17 to Paris (2018). 
James G. Stavridis – retired USN admiral, Supreme Allied Commander Europe July 2, 2009 - May 13, 2013 
Peter G. Tsouras – retired Lieutenant Colonel in the United States Army

Politicians

Federal

Ιncumbent politicians 

 Charlie Crist – U.S. Representative from Florida, former governor of Florida (2007–2011), former Florida attorney general (2003–2007) 
Gus Bilirakis – U.S. Representative from Florida, Republican co-chair of the Congressional Caucus on Hellenic Issues
 Chris Pappas – U.S. Representative from New Hampshire
 Dina Titus – U.S. Representative from Nevada
 John Sarbanes – U.S. Representative from Maryland
 Nicole Malliotakis – U.S. Representative from New York, former New York State assemblywoman (2011–2021)
 John Podesta – Senior Advisor to the President under President Biden, former White House Chief of Staff under President Clinton and campaign director for Hillary Clinton's 2016 Presidential run.

Former politicians 
Spiro Agnew – former Vice President of the United States, former governor of Maryland, first Greek-American governor in U.S. history
Michael Dukakis – former Governor of Massachusetts, 1988 Democratic presidential nominee
Paul Sarbanes – former U.S. Senator from Maryland; co-sponsored the Sarbanes–Oxley Act on corporate accounting
Olympia Snowe – former U.S. Senator from Maine, former First Lady of Maine
Paul Tsongas – former U.S. Senator from Massachusetts
John E. Sununu – former U.S. Senator from New Hampshire, former U.S. Representative from New Hampshire
John Brademas – former House Majority Whip, former U.S. Representative from Indiana, former president of New York University, former chair of Federal Reserve Bank of New York.
John H. Sununu – former White House Chief of Staff under President G.H.W. Bush and former Governor of New Hampshire 
Reince Priebus – former White House Chief of Staff under President Trump, former Chair of Republican National Committee
Jen Psaki – 34th White House Press Secretary under President Biden, former U.S. Department of State spokesperson under President Obama.
John Negroponte – U.S. Director of National Intelligence, former U.S. Ambassador to the United Nations
George Tenet – former U.S. Director of Central Intelligence
Sylvia Mathews Burwell – former U.S. Secretary of Health and Human Services under President Obama, former U.S. Director of the Office of Management and Budget, former White House Deputy Chief of Staff and president of American University
 Peter Peterson – former U.S. Secretary of Commerce – first Greek-American cabinet officer, head of Blackstone Group
George Stephanopoulos – political commentator, former Senior Advisor to the President under President Clinton, former White House Communications Director.
Brian Bulatao – former U.S. Under Secretary of State for Management under President Trump. 
Andrew Manatos – former U.S. Assistant Secretary of Commerce under President Carter 
Michael Bilirakis – former U.S. Representative from Florida. 
Nick Galifianakis – former U.S. Representative from North Carolina
Peter Kyros – former U.S. Representative from Maine
Skip Bafalis – former U.S. Representative from Florida 
Nicholas Mavroules – former U.S. Representative from Massachusetts, former mayor of Peabody, Massachusetts
Gus Yatron – former U.S. Representative from Pennsylvania, and boxer
George Gekas – former U.S. Representative from Pennsylvania
Zack Space – former U.S. Representative from Ohio
Suzanne Kosmas – former U.S. Representative from Florida
Ron Klink – former U.S. Representative from Pennsylvania
Michael James Pappas – former U.S. Representative from New Jersey 
William Antholis – former White House and State Department official, studies the presidency at the University of Virginia
Jon Favreau – former White House Director of Speechwriting
George Argyros – former U.S. Ambassador to Spain
James Costos – former U.S. Ambassador to Spain under Barack Obama.
Alexander Dimitry – diplomat, linguist and scholar who worked as a U.S. Ambassador to Costa Rica and Nicaragua
George T. Kalaris - CIA head of Counter-intelligence Staff and chief of the Soviet-East Europe Division
Tom C. Korologos – U.S. Ambassador to Belgium, Reagan lobbyist

Gregory Anthony Perdicaris – first U.S. Consul to Greece
Tasia Scolinos – Justice Department director of public affairs
 
Frances Townsend – former assistant to the president and homeland security advisor
Viron Vaky – former U.S. Ambassador to Costa Rica, Colombia and Venezuela

State

Incumbent politicians 
Chris Sununu - 82th Governor of New Hampshire 
Eleni Kounalakis – Lieutenant Governor of California and former U.S. Ambassador to Hungary (2010–2013)
Susan Bysiewicz – Lieutenant Governor of Connecticut, former Secretary of the State of Connecticut (1999–2011)
Stavros Anthony – Lieutenant Governor-elect of Nevada, Las Vegas Councilman
Alexi Giannoulias – Illinois Secretary of State-elect, former Illinois State Treasurer (2007–2011), 2010 Democratic nominee for U.S. Senate
Jimmy Patronis – Chief Financial Officer of Florida, former Florida State Representative (2006–2014)
Bruce Tarr (Tamvakologos) - Minority Leader of Massachusetts Senate, Massachusetts State Senator, former Massachusetts State Representative (1991–1995)
John Velis – Massachusetts Senate, Massachusetts State Senator
Diane DiZoglio – Massachusetts Senate, Massachusetts State Senator
Steven Xiarhos – Massachusetts Senate, Massachusetts State Representative
Tami Gouvela – Massachusetts Senate, Massachusetts State Representative
Denise Garlick – Massachusetts Senate, Massachusetts State Representative
Sandy Pappas – Minnesota State Senator representing St. Paul, former President of the Minnesota Senate (2013–2017) and former Minnesota State Representative (1985–1991)
Leonidas Raptakis – Rhode Island State Senator, former Rhode Island State Representative (1993–1997)
Michael Gianaris – Deputy Majority Leader of New York State Senate, New York State Senator and former New York State Representative (2001–2010)
James Skoufis – New York State Senator, former New York State Representative (2013–2018)
Andrew Gounardes – New York State Senator
Michael Tannousis – New York State Representative
John Lemondes Jr. – New York State Representative
Daphne Jordan – New York State Senator
Andreas Borgeas – California State Senator, former member of the Fresno County Board of Supervisors (2013–2018)
Eleni Kavros DeGraw – Connecticut State Representative
Nicole Klarides-Ditria – Connecticut State Representative 
Spiros Mantzavinos – Delaware State Senator
Leon Stavrinakis – South Carolina State Representative
Maria Tzanakis Collett – Pennsylvania State Senator
Steve Malagari – Pennsylvania State Representative
Phyllis Katsakiores – New Hampshire State Representative
Efstathia Booras – New Hampshire State Representative
Ted Gatsas – Executive Council of New Hampshire, former mayor of Manchester, New Hampshire (2010–2018), former member of New Hampshire Senate (2000–2009)
Stephan Pappas – Wyoming State Senator 
James C. Condos – Vermont Secretary of State, former Vermont State Senator (2000–2008)
Michael F. Easley Jr. – United States Attorney for the United States District Court for the Eastern District of North Carolina

Former politicians 
Phil Angelides – former California State Treasurer (1999–2007), 2006 Democratic nominee for governor of California
Nick Theodore – former Lieutenant Governor of South Carolina (1987–1995)
George Chanos – former Nevada Attorney General (2005–2007)
Stephanie Kopelousos – former Secretary of the Florida Department of Transportation (2007–2011) 
Dean Skelos – former New York State Senate member (1985–2015) and the Majority Leader of the New York State Senate (2008, 2011–2015)
Harry Meshel – former President of the Ohio Senate (1983–1984), former Ohio State Senator (1971–1993)
Dean Alfange – former Deputy New York Attorney General and founding member of the Liberal Party of New York
Jim Dabakis – former Utah State Senator (2012–2019), former chairman of the Utah Democratic Party
Themis Klarides – former Connecticut State Representative, former Minority Leader of the Connecticut House of Representatives (2015–2021)
Adeline Jay Geo-Karis – former Illinois State Senator (1979–2007), former naval officer 
Theodore Kanavas – former Wisconsin State Senator from Brookfield, Wisconsin (2001–2011)
John Pappageorge – former Michigan State Senator (2007–2014), former Michigan State Representative (1999–2004), former Oakland County, Michigan Commissioner (1989–1992) 
Phil P. Leventis – former South Carolina State Senator (1980–2012)
Leah Vukmir-Papachristou – former Wisconsin State Senator (2011–2019), former Wisconsin State Assemblywoman (2002–2011)
Gale D. Candaras – former Massachusetts State Senator  (2007–2015)
Samuel C. Maragos – former Illinois State Senator (1976–1980), former Illinois State Representative (1969–1976), former Judge of Cook County Circuit Court (1992–1995)
Johnny Joannou – former Virginia State Senator and Virginia State Delegate (1976–2016)
Nick Rerras – former Virginia State Senator (2000–2008)
Harry Meshel – former Ohio State Senator (1971–1993)
Nicholas C. Petris – former California State Senator (1966–1996)
Jim Aslanides – former Ohio State Representative (1999–2008)
Nicholas Kafoglis – former Kentucky State Senator (1988–1998), former Kentucky State Representative (1972–1976)
Lou Papan – former California State Assemblyman (1996-2002, 1973-1986) 
Dimitri Polizos – former Alabama State Representative (2013–2019)
Demetrius Atsalis – former Massachusetts State Representative (1999–2013)
James Bacalles – former New York State Assemblyman (1995–2010)
Elaine Alquist – former California State Assemblyman (1996-2002, 2004–2012)
Larry Chatzidakis – former New Jersey Assemblyman (1997–2008)
Frank Skartados – former New York State Assemblyman (2012-2018, 2009-2010) 
Theodore J. Sophocleus – former Maryland State Delegate (1999-2018, 1993-1995)
Joyce Spiliotis – former Massachusetts State Representative (2003–2012)
Sandra M. Pihos – former Illinois State Representative (2003–2015)
Matthew Mirones – former New York State Assemblyman (2002–2006) 
Theodore C. Speliotis – former Massachusetts State Representative (1979-1987, 1997–2021)
Philip J. Williams – former Michigan State Representative
Gery Chico – former Chair of the Illinois State Board of Education (2011–2015)
Mary P. Easley – former First Lady of North Carolina (2001–2009)

Local
Dean Trantalis – mayor of Fort Lauderdale, former city commissioner for Fort Lauderdale (2013–2018)
Bill Saffo – mayor of Wilmington, North Carolina
Maria Pappas – Cook County treasurer.
Ted Venetoulis – former Executive of Baltimore County
Art Agnos – former mayor of San Francisco
George Christopher – former mayor of San Francisco
Mike Pantelides – former mayor of Annapolis
John Rousakis – former mayor of Savannah, Georgia
Helen Boosalis – former mayor of Lincoln, Nebraska
P. Pete Chalos – second-longest-serving mayor in the history of Terre Haute, Indiana
George Cretekos – former mayor of Clearwater, Florida
George Harlamon – former mayor of Waterbury, Connecticut
David Scondras – former member of the Boston City Council

Science and academia

Academic administration 
Dennis Assanis – academic administrator, scientist, engineer and author, 28th president of the University of Delaware
Constantine W. Curris – educator, former president of the American Association of State Colleges and Universities 
James S. Economou – physician-scientist and university officer, currently the Vice Chancellor for Research at the University of California, Los Angeles 
Peter Liacouras – former president of Temple University
C. L. Max Nikias – engineer and president of the University of Southern California
Constantine Papadakis – president of Drexel University 
Symeon C. Symeonides – current dean of Willamette University College of Law
Armand Paul Alivisatos  –  chemist, 14th president of the University of Chicago
Arthur C. Vailas – 12th president of Idaho State University

Anthropology 
Dorothy D. Lee – anthropologist, author and philosopher of cultural anthropology

Biology - genetics 
Constantine John Alexopoulos – mycologist
Tom Maniatis – biologist
Aristides Patrinos – geneticist, biological, electrical and chemical engineer, human genome project
George Yancopoulos – biomedical scientist, chief scientific officer of Regeneron Pharmaceuticals
Panayiotis Zavos – geneticist

Chemistry 
Paul Anastas – chemist
Paul Alivisatos – nanotechnologist
Kyriacos Costa Nicolaou – chemist

Computer science 
Saul Amarel – artificial intelligence pioneer
Michael Dertouzos – innovator and director of the M.I.T. LCS
Paris Kanellakis – computer scientist
Christos Papadimitriou – professor of computer science at University of California, Berkeley
Katia Sycara – professor in the Robotics Institute, School of Computer Science at Carnegie Mellon University
Demetri Terzopoulos – computer scientist
Mihalis Yannakakis – computer scientist

Economics-management 
Chris Argyris – distinguished lifetime contributor to theory and practice of management
John Geanakoplos – economist, James Tobin Professor of Economics at Yale University
Dimitri B. Papadimitriou – economist, author, and college professor

Engineering 
Constantine A. Balanis – electrical engineer
John Baras – electrical engineer
George Doundoulakis – physicist and soldier who worked under British Intelligence during World War II and then served with the OSS in Thessaly, Greece. He is known by his twenty-six US patents in the fields of radar, electronics, and narrowband television.
Helias Doundoulakis – civil engineer who was employed at Grumman Aerospace Corporation for over thirty five years and group leader on many USAF and NASA projects. These included the Apollo space missions and the Lunar Excursion Module, the F-14 Tomcat fighter jet, and the Space Shuttle. His design of the oxygen tanks on the ill-fated Apollo 13 mission was instrumental in the return of the Apollo 13 crew, for which Doundoulakis was given a plaque by Captain James Lovell, Fred Haise, and Jack Swigert.   Served in the United States Army and the Office of Strategic Services (OSS) — as a spy during the Battle of Crete in WWII.
Maria Flytzani-Stephanopoulos – chemical engineer
Peter Karter – nuclear engineer and one of the pioneers of the modern recycling industry
Ares J. Rosakis – engineer
George Tchobanoglous – civil and environmental engineer, professor at University of California, Davis
Michael Tsapatsis – chemical engineer and materials scientist

English, debate, speech 
Helena Zachos (March 5, 1856 – February 28, 1951) - American college professor and elocutionist, who was on the faculty at Cooper Union from 1897 to 1939. Daughter of educator and abolitionist Professor John Celivergos Zachos.

John Celivergos Zachos (December 20, 1820 – March 20, 1898) - worked as Library Curator and Professor of English Language at Cooper Union from 1872 until his death in 1898. In 1861 was named the first superintendent of the Port Royal Experiment where freed slaves were educated on the liberated islands off of Charleston, SC.

Law 
George Anastaplo – professor at Loyola University Chicago School of Law
George C. Christie – James B. Duke emeritus professor of law at Duke University School of Law in Durham, North Carolina
Nicholas Tsoucalas – United States Judge of the United States Court of International Trade

Mathematics 
Tom M. Apostol – analytic number theorist and professor at the California Institute of Technology
Persi Diaconis – mathematician
James Dugundji – mathematician, professor of mathematics at the University of Southern California
George Karniadakis – applied mathematician and engineer
Panayotis G. Kevrekidis – applied mathematician
George C. Papanicolaou – mathematician
Athanasios Papoulis – engineer and applied mathematician
John Allen Paulos – mathematician
Thaleia Zariphopoulou – mathematician

Medicine 
George Canellos – oncologist and cancer researcher
John Ioannidis – physician
Albert Levis – psychiatrist and philosopher
Christos Socrates Mantzoros – physician scientist, internist - endocrinologist, Harvard Medical School professor and the editor-in-chief of the journal Metabolism: Clinical and Experimental
George Papanicolaou – created the pap test, and more generally, the field of cytopathology

Philosophy 
Diogenes Allen – professor of philosophy
Alexander Nehamas – professor of philosophy

Physics 
George A. Economou – optical systems expert
John Joannopoulos – physicist
Menas Kafatos – quantum physicist
Paul Kalas – astronomer
Stamatios Krimigis – space physics and instrumentation
Nicholas Metropolis – physicist
Andreas Gerasimos Michalitsianos – NASA astrophysicist
Dimitris Nanopoulos – professor of theoretical physics at TAMU
Costas N. Papanicolas – physicist
Costas Soukoulis – professor of physics at Iowa State University
Maria Spiropulu – experimental physicist, member of the CMS collaboration that found the Higgs boson particle
Tom Ypsilantis – physicist
Cosmas Zachos – physicist

Psychology 
Leda Cosmides – psychologist
Matina Horner – psychologist, sixth president of Radcliffe College

Sociology 
John Asimakopoulos – professor of sociology at the City University of New York-Bronx
Nicholas A. Christakis – sociologist and physician
Panos Bardis – sociologist

Various 
George Avery (professor) – professor for German Studies at Swarthmore College
Gust Avrakotos – political adviser
Kyriacos A. Athanasiou – biomedical engineer
Lambros D. Callimahos – NSA cryptanalyst
Harry J. Cargas – scholar, author, and teacher best known for his writing and research on the Holocaust, Jewish-Catholic relations, and American literature
Alexander Coucoulas – inventor, research engineer, and author
Raphael Demos – Alford Professor of Natural Religion, Moral Philosophy and Civil Polity, emeritus, at Harvard University
Deno Geanakoplos – renowned scholar of Byzantine history, Bradford Durfee professor emeritus at Yale University.
Sabine Iatridou – linguist 
Nicholas Negroponte – scientist, MIT Media Lab founder and director; architect 
C. A. Patrides – academic and writer, and "one of the greatest scholars of Renaissance literature of his generation"
Nicholas A. Peppas – chaired professor in engineering, University of Texas at Austin
Mary Tsingou – physicist and mathematician, known for being one of the first programmers on the MANIAC computer at Los Alamos National Laboratory
William V. Spanos – distinguished Professor of English and comparative literature at Binghamton University
Marius Vassiliou – computational physicist and aerospace executive

Sports

Aquatics 
Greg Louganis – Olympic diving champion (Greek by adoption; ethnically Samoan and Swedish) 
Christina Loukas – Olympic diver

Baseball 
Harry "the Golden Greek" Agganis – Boston University's first-ever football All-American and professional baseball player for the Boston Red Sox. 
Peter Angelos – MLB owner of the Baltimore Orioles and former basketball player.
Alex Anthopoulos – GM of Atlanta Braves and former GM of Toronto Blue Jays.
Annastasia Batikis – played in the All-American Girls Professional Baseball League in 1945
Clay Bellinger – MLB played for the New York Yankees and Anaheim Angels
Cody Bellinger – All-Star Outfielder for Los Angeles Dodgers and National League Rookie of the Year in 2017.
Cole Bellinger – Pitcher.  2017 draft pick of San Diego Padres
Peter Bourjos – MLB outfielder for Los Angeles Angels, St. Louis Cardinals, Tampa Bay Rays and Atlanta Braves.
Al Campanis – MLB player and executive of the Los Angeles Dodgers
Ria Cortesio – professional baseball umpire
Alex Grammas – MLB manager and infielder for St. Louis Cardinals, Cincinnati Reds and the Chicago Cubs.
Eric Karros – former MLB player for the Los Angeles Dodgers, and now a baseball broadcaster
Bobby Kingsbury – MLB player for the Pittsburgh Pirates
George Kontos – MLB pitcher with the San Francisco Giants
Paul Kostacopoulos – Head baseball coach at U.S. Naval Academy in Annapolis, MD
George Kottaras – catcher for 7 MLB teams including: Milwaukee Brewers, Oakland Athletics, Kansas City Royals and Cleveland Indians.
Chris Lemonis – Head coach of Mississippi State Bulldogs baseball.
Kay Lionikas – played in the All-American Girls Professional Baseball League from 1948–1950
Billy Loes – MLB Pitcher for the Dodgers and other teams
Nick Markakis – MLB outfielder who currently plays for the Atlanta Braves
Tino Martinez – former MLB first baseman for the N.Y. Yankees (Greek mother)
Aaron Miles – MLB player for the St. Louis Cardinals, Chicago White Sox, and Colorado Rockies (paternal grandmother)
Mike Moustakas – MLB player for the Kansas City Royals
Gus Niarhos – MLB Yankees, White Sox, Red Sox, Phillies
Erik Pappas – MLB catcher for the Chicago Cubs and the St. Louis Cardinals.
Milt Pappas – MLB pitcher for the Baltimore Orioles and Cincinnati Reds and other teams
June Peppas – All-American Girls Professional Baseball League 1948–1954
Lou Skizas – MLB player for NY Yankees (1956), Kansas City Athletics (1956–57), Detroit Tigers (1958), Chicago White Sox (1959)
George Theodore – MLB outfielder for the New York Mets
Gus Triandos – MLB player for the Baltimore Orioles and other teams
Clint Zavaras – MLB pitcher with the Seattle Mariners in 1989

Basketball 
Giannis Antetokounmpo – Professional player in the NBA for the Milwaukee Bucks, 2019 MVP.  
Zach Auguste – Notre Dame Fighting Irish college and also professional basketball player
Michael Bramos – basketballer, member of the Greek national basketball team
Nick Calathes – former Florida Gators basketball player, and professional player
Pat Calathes – professional basketball player
Pavlos Diakoulas – former professional basketball player 
 Tyler Dorsey (born 1996) - basketball player in the Israeli Basketball Premier League
Angelo Drossos – owner of the San Antonio Spurs basketball team from 1973 to 1988 (NBA Executive of the Year Award in 1978)
Nick Galis – former professional basketball player, played in Europe (where he is known as Nikos Galis), and regarded as one of Europe's all-time basketball greats
Steve Giatzoglou – former professional basketball player
George Kastrinakis – former professional basketball player in Greece
John Korfas – former professional basketball player
Kosta Koufos – professional basketball player for the Sacramento Kings in the NBA and the Greece men's national basketball team 
Steve Lappas – former college basketball coach at Villanova and UMass
Ted Manakas – shooting guard for the Princeton Tigers men's basketball team under coach Pete Carril; played briefly in NBA for Kansas City-Omaha Kings
David Nelson – former professional Greek basketball player
Nick Paulos – professional basketball player 
Kurt Rambis – former NBA professional basketball player, won 4 championships with the L.A. Lakers (birth name Kyriakos Rambidis)
Chris Roupas – former Greek American Professional Basketball Player, First Penn State Nittany Lion to play professional basketball in Greece
Jake Tsakalidis – former NBA player for Phoenix Suns, Memphis Grizzlies and Houston Rockets.
Lou Tsioropoulos – former NBA professional basketball player with the Boston Celtics

Body building and fitness training 
John Sitaras – fitness professional, creator of the Sitaras method and founder of Sitaras Fitness in New York City
Craig Titus – American bodybuilder
Christos Nikitas Poulis - athletic trainer

Boxing 
Anton Christoforidis – professional boxer, NBA World Light Heavyweight Champion 1941
Michael Katsidis – (born in Australia) current boxer

Football 
Harry "the Golden Greek" Agganis1 - college football star and 1st-ever All-American at Boston University.  Drafted by the Cleveland Browns but turned down the offer to play baseball for the Boston Red Sox.
Steve Alexakos – played OL in college for San Jose State and then NFL for Denver Broncos (1970) and New York Giants (1971).
Dee Andros (born Demosthenes Konstandies "Dee" Andrecopoulos) - American football player, coach, and college athletics administrator.  Brother of Plato Andros.
Plato Andros (Plato Gus Andrecopoulos) - college All-American guard for the University of Oklahoma. He played four years in the NFL for the Chicago Cardinals. Brother of Dee Andros.
Zach Collaros – quarterback for the University of Cincinnati football team
Jim Eliopulos – NFL player for the New York Jets
Chris Farasopoulos – NFL player, played for the New York Jets
Alex Holmes – NFL tight end for the St. Louis Rams, mother is Greek
Alex Karras – NFL player with the Detroit Lions, wrestler and actor
Lou Karras – NFL player with the Washington Redskins, eldest brother of Alex Karras
Ted Karras – NFL player with the Chicago Bears and Detroit Lions.  Won NFL championship with 1963 Bears. Older brother of Alex Karras
Ted Karras Jr. - NFL player and Super Bowl champion for 1987 Washington Redskins
Ted Karras III - Center for Cincinnati Bengals and New England Patriots. Played in 3 consecutive Super Bowls for Patriots, winning 2 championships (2016 & 2018).
Jim Karsatos – Ohio State QB in 1980s
Niko Koutouvides – NFL linebacker for the Seattle Seahawks, Tampa Bay Buccaneers, Denver Broncos and New England Patriots
Bill Mackrides – QB for the Philadelphia Eagles. He led them to 2 NFL championships in 1948 and 1949.
Chris Maragos – NFL safety for two Super Bowl champions: 2013 Seattle Seahawks and 2017 Philadelphia Eagles.

Archie Matsos  (Archimidis Matsos) - All-American linebacker at Michigan State in 1950s. Played in the AFL (pre-merger) for the Buffalo Bills, Oakland Raiders, Denver Broncos and San Diego Chargers.
Joe Panos – NFL player with the Philadelphia Eagles and Buffalo Bills 1994–2000 (birth name Zois Panagiotopoulos)
Petros Papadakis – host of various sports shows on radio, former college football tailback and team captain at USC 1996–2000.
Tony Pashos – former NFL offensive lineman for six teams, including with the Baltimore Ravens and Jacksonville Jaguars.
Lonie Paxton – NFL New England Patriots long-snapper 2001–2003
Peter Philipakos – Soccer player, formerly of Olympiacos F.C.
Pete Pihos – NFL player with the Philadelphia Eagles (Pro Football Hall of Fame). Is the only NFL player to have been named All-Pro on both offense and defense in the same year.
Gene Rossides – Star QB who presided over the Golden Era of Columbia Football of 1945–48. Drafted by [New York Giants] in 1949.  Protégé of Sid Luckman.
Fred Smerlas – NFL player for the Buffalo Bills and the New England Patriots
Alex Spanos – NFL owner of the San Diego Chargers 
A. G. Spanos – named President of Business Operations for the San Diego Chargers in 2015.  Grandson of Alex Spanos.  
Dean Spanos – President and CEO of San Diego Chargers. Son of Alex Spanos.
Frank Stams {Stamoulis} - defensive lineman for University of Notre Dame, including their 1988 National Championship team. He was converted to linebacker in the NFL, where he played for the Los Angeles Rams, Cleveland Browns and Kansas City Chiefs.
Matt Stover – NFL player, kicker for Baltimore Ravens
Harry Theofiledes – backup QB for Washington Redskins in 1968. 
Garo Yepremian – NFL player (Greek Cypriot origin)
Gust Zarnas – NFL player with the Chicago Bears and Green Bay Packers 1938–1940
John Mellekas- NFL player Chicago Bears, San Francisco 49ers, Philadelphia Eagles

Gambling, bookmakers, poker 
Steve Billirakis – Bracelet winner in the World Series of Poker
Nick "the Greek" Dandolos1 - one of the most famous players in the history of poker
Sam Mastrogiannis – Bracelet winner in the World Series of Poker
Billy Pappas – poker player and world champion foosball player
Athanasios Polychronopoulos – Bracelet winner in the World Series of Poker
Chris Tsiprailidis – Bracelet winner in the World Series of Poker
Jimmy "the Greek" Snyder James George Snyder Sr. (born Dimetrios Georgios Synodinos, September 9, 1918 – April 21, 1996) - American sports commentator and Las Vegas oddsmaker.

Hockey 
Tom Anastos – Head Hockey Coach, Michigan State University
Andreas Athanasiou – currently plays Center for the Detroit Red Wings. 
Adam Burish – NHL player with the Dallas Stars
Jimmy Carson – NHL hockey player (original family surname Kyriazopoulos)
Chris Chelios – Hockey Hall of Fame hockey player for the Montreal Canadiens, Chicago Black Hawks and Detroit Red Wings.
Jake Chelios – NHL hockey player. Son of Chris Chelios.
Cleon Daskalakis – NHL goaltender for Boston Bruins 1984–87.
Peter Douris – played in NHL 1985 to 1998 for the Winnipeg Jets, Boston Bruins, Mighty Ducks of Anaheim and Dallas Stars.
Nick Fotiu – NHL 1973–1990, played for the New York Rangers, Hartford Whalers, Calgary Flames, Philadelphia Flyers and Edmonton Oilers.
Bob Halkidis – Between 1985 and 2001 he played for six NHL Teams.
Krys Kolanos – NHL center for Phoenix Coyotes, Edmonton Oilers, Minnesota Wild, and Calgary Flames.
Chris Kontos – former NHL player known for his prolific scoring in the play-offs
Tom Kostopoulos – NHL hockey player for six teams including the Los Angeles Kings
Chris Kotsopoulos – NHL defenseman between 1978 and 1990. He played for New York Rangers, Hartford Whalers,  Toronto Maple Leafs and Detroit Red Wings.
Nick Kypreos – played in NHL (1986–1997) for the Washington Capitals, Hartford Whalers, New York Rangers and Toronto Maple Leafs
George Parros – NHL hockey player
Steve Staios – NHL hockey player
Nikos Tselios – AHL hockey player. Cousin of Chris Chelios.
Trevor Zegras – made his NHL debut with Anaheim Ducks on February 22, 2021.

Mixed martial arts 
John Critzos II – martial arts fighter, champion, and instructor
Alex Karalexis – professional fighter with the Ultimate Fighting Championship

Motor sports 
Art Arfons – world land speed record holder
George Constantine – racing driver
Chris Karamesines – drag racer and one of NHRA's early pioneers
Danny Kladis – race car driver
Andy Papathanassiou – pit crew coach
Alex Tremulis – industrial designer of the Tucker (Automobile Hall of Fame)
Alex Xydias – influential figure in the early days of the auto racing sport involving hot rods
Emanuel Zervakis – NASCAR driver and team owner

Soccer / association football 
Andreas Chronis – professional football player
George John – soccer player, currently with Major League Soccer club New York City FC
Gus Kartes – former Chicago Storm footballer
Frank Klopas – retired soccer player, formerly of AEK, Apollon, Kansas City Wizards, Chicago Fire and the U.S. national team
Alexi Lalas – soccer player for the L.A. Galaxy, U.S. national team
John Limniatis – Canadian retired professional soccer player. He played 44 times and scored one goal for the Canadian national team, also captaining and later becoming the head coach of the Montreal Impact.
Peter Skouras – retired soccer player, formerly of Olympiakos F.C., PAOK Thessaloniki, San Diego Sockers of the North American Soccer League, and United States Youth National Teams

Surfing 
Laird Hamilton – Big wave surfer. Born Laird John Zerfas. Greek father.
Caroline Marks – World Surf League professional surfer (ranked #8 internationally in 2018)

Tennis 
Eleni Rossides
Pete Sampras – tennis player, considered one of the best tennis players in history

Track and field 
Dean Karnazes – ultramarathon champion, writer, businessman
Bob Mathias -  decathlete. Won 2 Olympic gold medals:  London (1948) and Helsinki (1952).  Became younger gold medal winner (age 17) in 1948. 
Tom Pappas – track & field decathlete, 2003 world decathlon champion and 2-time Olympian.

Winter sports 
Tara Dakides – pro snowboarder and champion from California
Themistocles Leftheris – American pair skater, 2007 U.S. National Pairs bronze medalist

Wrestling 
David Batista (Bautista) - former WWE professional wrestler (Greek mother and Filipino father) and actor 
Dixie Carter (wrestling) – President of Total Nonstop Action Wrestling
Maria Kanellis – professional wrestler who has worked with WWE, TNA, and ROH. Former contestant on Celebrity Apprentice
Jim Londos – champion wrestler during the 1930s-50s. Birth name Christos Theophilos.
Helen Maroulis – freestyle wrestler
George Metropoulos – Greco-Roman and freestyle wrestler
Tom Packs – professional wrestling promoter - one of the top promoters over the first half of the 20th century
Dawn Marie Psaltis (Dawn Marie) - former WWE wrestler
Trish Stratus – WWE wrestler 
George Tragos – champion wrestler in Greece and trainer of American champion Lou Thesz.  Co-founder of Wrestling Hall of Fame.
George Zaharias – sports promoter and professional wrestler in the 1930s (birth name Theodore Vetoyanis). Husband of Babe Didrikson Zaharias.

Sports journalism 
Bob Costas – NBC sportscaster
Spero Dedes – (born February 27, 1979) is an American sportscaster. He is currently employed by CBS Sports, calling the NFL, NBA, and college basketball. Previously worked play-by-play for the Los Angeles Lakers (radio) and New York Knicks (radio & TV).
Jimmy Cefalo – sportscaster & former NFL wide receiver for Miami Dolphins.
Mike Galanos – CNN/Sports Illustrated anchor
Harry Kalas – sports announcer
John Manuel – co-editor in chief, Baseball America magazine
Rory Markas – sports announcer
Petros Papadakis – former USC Trojans running back, sports talk show host
Ted Sarandis – sports announcer
Jimmy "the Greek" Snyder – James George Snyder Sr. (born Dimetrios Georgios Synodinos, September 9, 1918 – April 21, 1996), was an American sports commentator on CBS' The NFL Today from 1976 to 1988 and Las Vegas oddsmaker.

Criminal figures
Gus Alex (April 1, 1916 – July 24, 1998) - high-ranking associate of the Chicago Outfit
Peter "Pete the Greek" Diapoulas - body guard of NYC mobster Joe Gallo, was present the night of Gallo's assassination.
Fotios Geas – mobster involved with the Genovese crime family and murderer of Whitey Bulger in Hazelton (WV) Federal Penitentiary
Tom Kapatos – New York City mobster, also known as "The Greek"
Dr. George C. Nichopoulos – personal physician to Elvis Presley from 1970 to 1977 (Presley's death). Although exonerated in the death of Presley, Dr. Nichopoulos was later stripped of his medical license due to over-prescribing medications to many other patients in the state of Tennessee.
Michael Thevis - mobster
Peter Kourakos "Pete The Greek" - founder of Greek-American organized crime in Astoria, Queens, New York.  
Spyredon "Spiros" Velentzas – Spiros Velentzas, aka "Sakafias", expanded the activities of the Kourakos crime family in New York City in the 1980s-1990s.

See also
Greeks
Greek Cypriots
Greek Americans
Hellenism (disambiguation)

References

External links
 American Hellenic Council

Greek Americans
Americans
Greek